Little Common may refer to the following places in England:

 Little Common, East Sussex, an area of Bexhill-on-Sea, East Sussex
 Little Common F.C., a football club
 Little Common, Lincolnshire, a location
 Little Common, Shropshire, a small hamlet in Shropshire
 Little Common, West Sussex, a location